The Man Outside is a 1947 play.

The Man Outside may also refer to:
The Man Outside (1913 film), a comedy film
The Man Outside (1933 film), a film starring Joan Gardner
The Man Outside (1967 film), a British film starring Van Heflin
Man Outside (1986 film), a film starring Levon Helm